Switch is an American R&B/funk band that recorded for the Gordy label in the late 1970s, releasing songs such as "There'll Never Be", "I Call Your Name", and "Love Over & Over Again". Switch influenced bands such as DeBarge, which featured the siblings of Switch band members Bobby and Tommy DeBarge.

Biography

Early years
The group was formed in Mansfield, Ohio, in December 1976 by Gregory Williams. They recorded a demo tape in Columbus, Ohio with the financial assistance of Bernd Lichters. Switch included Gregory Williams, brothers Tommy DeBarge and Bobby DeBarge, all from Grand Rapids, Michigan, along with Akron, Ohio natives Phillip Ingram (brother of James Ingram), Eddie Fluellen, and Jody Sims (originally from Steubenville, Ohio). Williams, Bobby DeBarge, and Sims had been members of White Heat, which released a self-titled album on RCA in 1975, but the band's producer, Barry White, soon shuttered his Soul Unlimited production company and dropped all the acts on the roster. Williams, then living in Akron, decided to form his own band.

Success years
The new group would become Switch due to their ability to switch to different lead vocalists and instruments during a song. After a demo was recorded by the newly formed, unnamed band, Williams and Sims flew to LA and by sheer coincidence got the attention of Jermaine Jackson, former member of the Jackson 5, and Hazel Gordy Jackson (Jermaine's then-wife and daughter of Motown chief Berry Gordy Jr.), who heard the group's demo tape.  Within weeks, the group was signed to the Motown Records Gordy subsidiary label.  They recorded and released their self titled debut album some 18 months later in 1978, which featured their first Top 10 R&B hit single, entitled "There'll Never Be". The song also proved to be their biggest success on the Billboard Hot 100, where it was a Top 40 hit (their only one), peaking at #36.

Their songs were written by Williams, Bobby DeBarge and Sims, sometimes in collaboration with Jermaine Jackson. Though they never managed to achieve significant crossover success into the pop singles chart, they were a consistent presence on the R&B charts through the late 1970s with albums such as Switch II from 1979 (their second release), This Is My Dream and Reaching For Tomorrow in 1980.  Their final release on Gordy was Switch V, released in 1981. Songs such as "I Wanna Be Closer", "We Like to Party", "I Call Your Name", "Best Beat in Town", and "Love Over and Over Again" also became hits for the group.

Later years
Shortly after the DeBarge brothers left Switch to mentor their younger siblings in the group DeBarge, and lead singer Ingram left to pursue a solo career, Switch took on new vocalists and musicians: singer Renard Gallo, Gonzales Ozen, and bassist Phil Upchurch Jr.  This configuration of Switch signed with Total Experience (home of their contemporaries the Gap Band) and recorded a final album Am I Still Your Boyfriend in 1984, breaking up later that year.

In 1985, Switch reformed with Williams and all new members, getting little traction.

In 1991, Motown released a greatest hits compilation album by the band.  A similar version on the 20th Century Masters series released more recently is all that remains in print of this band.

Former lead singer Bobby DeBarge died of AIDS-related complications in Grand Rapids, Michigan on August 16, 1995, at age 39.  

Switch has since reunited, featuring original members founder/leader Williams, Fluellen, Ingram, original sessions/on stage guitarist Michael McGloiry, and new lead vocalist Akili Nickson.

Former bass guitar player and backup singer Tommy DeBarge died on October 21, 2021, at age 64.

Personnel
Gregory Williams (1976–present): vocals, keyboards, trumpet
Eddie Fluellen (1977–present): keyboards, trombone, vocals
Phillip Ingram (1976–1984; present): vocals, keyboards, percussion
Bobby DeBarge (1977–1984): vocals, piano/keyboards, drums
Tommy DeBarge (1976–1984): vocals, bass guitar
Jody Sims (1976–1984): vocals, drums
Michael McGloiry (original session guitarist) (1978–present): guitar
Attala Giles (1981–1984): guitar, bass, keyboards
Renard Gallo (1982–1984): vocals, percussion
Gonzales Ozen (1982–1984): vocals, percussion
Akili Nickson (2003–present): lead vocals
Christopher Hawkins (1985–1987): lead vocals
Anthony Watters (1985–1987):  Guitar, vocals
Howie Carbaugh (1985–1987):  Drums
Charles Meyers (1985–1987): Bass, vocals

Discography

Studio albums

 Credited to White Heat.
 Credited to Hot-Ice.

Compilations
The Best of Switch (1991, Motown)
20th Century Masters - The Millennium Collection: The Best of Switch (2001, Motown)

Singles

References

Further reading

External links

 

1975 establishments in Ohio
1984 disestablishments in Ohio
Switch (band)
Switch (band)
Switch (band)
Switch (band)
Switch (band)
Switch (band)
Switch (band)
DeBarge family